Darci Kistler (born June 4, 1964) is an American ballerina.  She is often said to be the last muse for choreographer George Balanchine.

Early life
Kistler was born in Riverside, California, the fifth child (with four older brothers) of a medical doctor and his wife.  Her brothers excelled in amateur wrestling, and she followed them into water-skiing, basketball, football and horseback riding.

Ballet career
At age 4, Kistler received her first tutu and began ballet training that same year. She claimed although she was always athletic, she could never keep to her brothers—so ballet turned out to be one cornerstone she had mastered. After seeing a ballet performance of Rudolf Nureyev and Margot Fonteyn, she decided she wanted to take up ballet herself. She studied with Mary Lynn at Mary Lynn's Ballet Arts and later with Irina Kosmovska in Los Angeles.

In early 1979, Kistler was selected to study at New York City Ballet's School of American Ballet (SAB), where she met George Balanchine. She joined the New York City Ballet (NYCB) corps de ballet in 1980, and was featured in a Time article before the end of the year.

Kistler was promoted to (NYCB) soloist in 1981 and principal dancer in 1982, the youngest ever at 17 years. Signature roles include Balanchine's Jewels (Diamonds), Agon, Prodigal Son and Symphony in C. She danced the rôle of the Sugarplum Fairy in City Ballet's 1993 film version of The Nutcracker. She eventually wrote her own autobiography "Ballerina: My Story" as a children's book.

Kistler joined the SAB's permanent faculty in 1994.

Throughout her career, she had numerous dance-related injuries, including a broken ankle that sidelined her for three years. She went through several surgeries, including for her back.

In February 2009, Kistler announced her retirement from New York City Ballet at the end of the 2010 season. Her farewell performance took place on June 27, 2010, and consisted of ballets choreographed by Balanchine and Martins:

 
 Monumentum pro Gesualdo
 Movements for Piano and Orchestra
 A Midsummer Night’s Dream excerpt
 Danses Concertantes
 Swan Lake final act

Personal life 
Kistler married New York City Ballet's balletmaster-in-chief Peter Martins in 1991. In July 1992, Martins was arrested and held for five hours after Kistler phoned the police for help. Kistler filed an affidavit accusing him of assaulting her, pushing and slapping her, and cutting and bruising her arms and legs, leading to a charge of third-degree assault (a misdemeanor). Kistler dropped the charges a few days later, saying she preferred to resolve the matter without the court's intervention. When she next performed in a ballet two days later, she reportedly wore heavy makeup to conceal bruises she had suffered. Several people who knew the two well claimed it wasn't the first time Martins had hit Kistler.

Kistler and Martins have one daughter, Talicia Tove Martins, born June 13, 1996.

Jerome Robbins
 
 Andantino
 Gershwin Concerto
 Piccolo Balletto

Ulysses Dove
 Red Angels

Robert La Fosse
 Danses de Cour

Peter Martins

 Adams Violin Concerto
 Bach Concerto V
 Burleske
 The Chairman Dances
 Delight of the Muses
 Guide to Strange Places
 Harmonielehre
 Morgen
 Octet NYCB premiere
 Piano-Rag-Music
 Romeo + Juliet Lady Capulet
 The Sleeping Beauty
 Stabat Mater
 Suite from Histoire du Soldat
 Symphonic Dances
 Symphony No. 1
 Tālā Gaisma
 Thou Swell
 Todo Buenos Aires
 Viva Verdi

Featured roles

George Balanchine
 
 Agon
 Apollo
 Brahms–Schoenberg Quartet
 Bugaku
 Concerto Barocco
 Episodes
 The Nutcracker Dewdrop and the Sugar Plum Fairy
 Jewels Diamonds
 A Midsummer Night's Dream
 Monumentum pro Gesualdo
 Movements for Piano and Orchestra
 Mozartiana
 Orpheus
 Prodigal Son
 Robert Schumann's Davidsbündlertänze
 La Sonnambula
 Sylvia pas de deux
 Symphony in C second movement
 Tzigane
 Union Jack
 Variations pour une Porte et un Soupir
 Vienna Waltzes
 Walpurgisnacht Ballet
 Western Symphony

Jerome Robbins
 
 In G Major
 In the Night

Peter Martins
 
 Papillons
 Songs of the Auvergne
 Valse Triste

Television
 PBS Dance in America
 Bournonville Dances William Tell pas de deux
 Serenade
 PBS Kennedy Center Honors tribute to Alexandra Danilova
 Swan Lake pas de deux
 PBS Dance in America The Balanchine Celebration
 PBS Live from Lincoln Center New York City Ballet's Diamond Project: Ten Years of New Choreography, 2002
 Them Twos
 PBS Live from Lincoln Center Lincoln Center Celebrates Balanchine 100, 2004
 Liebeslieder Walzer

References

Further reading
 Darci Kistler;  Alicia Kistler, Ballerina: My Story (Pocket Books, New York, 1993)

External links
 NYCB website – Darci Kistler
 Archival footage of Nikolaj Hubbe and Darci Kistler performing Apollo in 2002 at Jacob's Pillow
 Internet Movie Database--Darci Kistler

American ballerinas
Artists from Riverside, California
1964 births
Living people
New York City Ballet principal dancers
School of American Ballet alumni
School of American Ballet faculty
Mae L. Wien Faculty Award recipients